Bohdan Smoleń (9 June 1947 – 15 December 2016) was a Polish comedian, singer and actor. He was a member of the Kabaret TEY, and was featured in the television show Świat według Kiepskich (Night and Day).

On 20 May 2009 he was awarded the silver medal "Zasłużony Kulturze - Gloria Artis" for his contributions to Polish culture.

He died in a Poznań hospital on 15 December 2016 from a serious infection linked to lung disease. He was 69.

Discography 
Ani be, ani me, ani kukuryku (1995)
Rzężenia Smolenia aka Śpiewam piosenki, Dzieła wybrane *cz. I i Mężczyzną być (1988)
Rzężę po raz drugi, spłacę wasze długi
Stawiam wciąż na Lecha (1993)
Szalałeś, szalałeś (1995)
Widziały gały co brały (1996)
Jubileusz, czyli 50 lat wątroby Bohdana Smolenia (1997)
6 dni z życia kolonisty (2003)
Aaa tam cicho być... (2004)
Na chorobowym (2004)
Amerykańska gra (1996)
Dorota ma kota (1995)
Na chorobowym (2004)
Cepry Hej ! (1995)

References

1947 births
2016 deaths
Polish male actors
Polish comedians
Recipients of the Gold Cross of Merit (Poland)
Recipients of the Silver Medal for Merit to Culture – Gloria Artis
20th-century Polish male singers
21st-century Polish male singers
21st-century Polish singers
People from Bielsko
Polish male television actors
Polish cabaret performers